Richard Huloet was a 16th-century English lexicographer. He was born at Wisbech, Isle of Ely, Cambridgeshire. He was a contemporary of Peter Levens, John Withals, and John Véron.

According to some sources,  Samuel Johnson and he were the first writers in the English language to use the term "honeymoon". He was the author of the Abecedarium Anglico-Latinum (1552). The book was dedicated to Thomas Goodrich, Bishop of Ely and chancellor of England.

References

External links
 Richard Huloet's entry on Wikisource
 Richard Huloet's entry in Encyclopedia Britannica

Year of birth missing
Year of death missing
British writers